Prince Mikhail Petrovich Barataev (January 1, 1784 – July 30, 1856) was a Russian Empire bureaucrat of Georgian origin and an amateur numismatist, the first to have studied the coinage of Georgia.

Barataev was born in Simbirsk (now Ulyanovsk) into the expatriate Georgian noble family of Baratashvili. His father, Prince Pyotr Mikhailovich Barataev (1734-1789), was a general in the Russian army and Simbirsk governor. His mother came of the Russian untitled noble family of Nazimov. He served as an artillery officer from 1798 to 1809 and retired with wounds received in the Napoleonic Wars. From 1820 to 1835, Barataev was a head of nobility of the Simbirsk governorate. He founded a Freemasonic lodge "Key to Virtues" (Ключ к добродетели) in Simbirsk and was briefly arrested in 1826 for his ties with the Decembrists.

In 1839, Barataev was appointed a director of the customs department in Georgia. During his tenure in the Caucasus, Barataev became interested in numismatics and collected a unique collection of Georgian coins. Upon his retirement in 1844, Barataev published, in French and Russian, his principal study The Numismatic Facts of the Kingdom of Georgia (Russian: Нумизматические факты грузинского царства; French: Documents numismatiques du Royaume de Géorgie) – the first scholarly treatment of the subject in question – which won him a membership of the French Academy of Sciences. He died at his estate Barataevka in Simbirsk.

References 

1784 births
1856 deaths
19th-century historians from Georgia (country)
Nobility of Georgia (country)
Princes from the Russian Empire
Numismatists from the Russian Empire
Military personnel of the Napoleonic Wars from the Russian Empire
People from Ulyanovsk
People from the Russian Empire of Georgian descent
Russian Freemasons